An organum is any one of a number of musical instruments which were the forerunners of the organ.

The name comes from the Latin organum, meaning any tool in general or any musical instrument in particular (or an organ of the body), which in turn came from the Greek organon, with similar meanings, itself derived from ergon and so meaning something by which a task is accomplished. The name organum in turn gave rise to the modern everyday term organ.

External links
Etymology of the word organ
Etymology of the word organum

Organs (music)